The 2022 Minnesota Secretary of State election was held on November 8, 2022, to elect the Secretary of State of Minnesota. Incumbent DFLer Steve Simon won re-election to a third term.

Democratic–Farmer–Labor primary

Candidates

Nominated
Steve Simon, incumbent secretary of state

Eliminated in primary
Steve Carlson, perennial candidate

Endorsements

Results

Republican primary

Candidates

Nominated
Kim Crockett, former vice president of the Center of the American Experiment, a conservative think tank

Eliminated in primary
Erik van Mechelen

Dropped out at convention
Kelly Jahner-Byrne, candidate in the 2020 Minnesota House of Representatives election for seat 53B

Withdrew before convention
Phillip Parrish, former U.S. naval intelligence officer

Results

General election

Debate
A debate was held on October 2 by WCCO.

Predictions

Endorsements

Polling 

 Graphical summary

Results

Results by county

See also
 2022 Minnesota elections

Notes

References

External links
 Elections & Voting - Minnesota Secretary of State

Official campaign websites
Kim Crockett (R) for Secretary of State
Steve Simon (DFL) for Secretary of State

Secretary of State
Minnesota
Minnesota Secretary of State elections